Tero Forss (born 12 July 1968) is a retired Finnish professional footballer, best remembered for his eight years as a forward and midfielder with Inter Turku, for whom he is the record scorer and a member of the club's Hall of Fame. After retiring as a player, he became a manager and managed FC Boda, TuWe and BK-46. As of October 2021, together with Markku Tolonen, he was joint-manager of KaaPo Women.

Personal life 
Forss is a member of a football family. His father (Rainer) was a player, manager and coach and his sons Marcus and Niclas are involved in football.

Honours 
 Inter Turku Hall of Fame
 Veikkausliiga Hall of Fame

References 

Living people
Finnish footballers
1968 births
Association football forwards
Finland youth international footballers
Finnish football managers
Mestaruussarja players
TPS Turku football managers
Turun Palloseura footballers
Veikkausliiga players
Åbo IFK players
Rovaniemen Palloseura players
FC Inter Turku players
Ykkönen players
Salon Palloilijat players
Reipas Lahti players

Association football midfielders